Gabriel Prokofiev (born 6 January 1975) is a Russian-British composer, producer, DJ, and Artistic Director of the Nonclassical record label and nightclub.

Early life
Gabriel Prokofiev was born on 6 January 1975 to an English mother and a Russian father, the artist Oleg Prokofiev, and is the grandson of the composer Sergei Prokofiev. He studied composition at the University of Birmingham and the University of York and became a producer of Dance, Electro, Hip-hop and Grime music.

Career
He founded the independent record label and night club Nonclassical in 2004, as a way of bringing classical music to younger people.

Selected works

Ballet
 Ein Winternachtstraum, 2011
 The Ghost of Gunby Hall, [Commissioned by Lincoln Arts], 2012
 Howl, 2013
 Strange Blooms, 2013
 Terra Incognita, for string ensemble of 10 players + electronics, [Commissioned by Rambert Dance Company], 2014
 Bayadere – The Ninth Life, Electronics with Piano & Percussion, [Commissioned by Shobana Jeyasingh Dance Company for the Royal Opera House, London 2015
 Dark Glow, [Commission by Stuttgarter Ballet], 2016
Sense of Time, [Commissioned by Birmingham Royal Ballet], 2019

Orchestral
 Concerto for Turntables & Orchestra, 2006
 Dance Suite for Viola, String Orchestra, Trombones & Percussion, 2008
 Beethoven 9 Remix, 2011
 Concerto for Bass Drum & Orchestra, 2012
 Spheres for Violin and String Orchestra, 2013
 Cello Concerto No 1 for cello and orchestra, 2013
 Ruthven's Last Dance two dances for orchestra, 2013
 Concerto for Trumpet, Percussion, Turntables and Orchestra, 2014
 Concerto for Violin and Orchestra (1914), 2014
 Saxophone Concerto, 2016
 Concerto for Turntables & Orchestra II, 2016
 Two Caprices for Violin and Orchestra, 2016
 Olga's Miniatures, 2017

Symphonic Works / Overtures
 Overture 87654321, Symphony Orchestra (double wind & brass, 4 perc), [Commissioned by the Orchestre de Pau Pays de Béarn, 2014
 Dial 1-900 Mix-A-Lot+ Orchestrations of Sir-Mix-A-Lot tracks: Baby Got Back & Posse on Broadway, [Commissioned by Seattle Symphony, 2014
 Carnet de Voyage, Symphony orchestra (double wind & brass, 4 perc), [Commissioned by the Orchestre de Pau Pays de Béarn, 2015
 When the City Rules, [Commissioned by Seattle Symphony and Real Orquesta Sinfónica de Sevilla], 2016

Chamber
 String Quartet No. 1, 2003
 Three Dances for String Trio, Bass Clarinet, Piano & Scratch DJ, 2004
 String Quartet No. 2, 2006
 Stolen Guitars suite for electric guitar and 2 laptops, commissioned by POW ensemble for GUADAEMUS, Holland, 2008
 Bogle Move for string quartet, 2009
 Cello Multitracks suite for solo cello and multitracked cellos, or cello nonet, 2010
 String Quartet No. 3, 2010
 The Ghost of Gunby Hall, a golden fable for 2 actors, chamber ensemble, laptop & optional SATB choir, 2012
 Triangles, for 9 custom-made Triangles, [Commissioned by Fari Shams for Raimund Abraham Musikerhaus, Museum Insel Hombroich], Düsseldorf 2012
 Violin Duo No.1, 2014
 The River Conqueror, 2015
 Pieces for Erhu & Piano, 2015
 Concerto for Turntables & Orchestra, 2016
 Broken Screen, [Commissioned by Alison Balsom], 2017
 Six Observations for Flute Trio, [Commissioned by Nonclassical for Tempest Flute Trio], 2013
 Two Dances [Commissioned by the Arts Council for Tate Ensemble @ Bath Festival], 2004

Instrumental
 Three Dances for String Trio, Bass Clarinet, Piano & Scratch DJ, 2004
 Pianobook No. 1 for solo piano, 2006
 Sleeveless Scherzo for solo violin and solo dancer, 2008
 IMPORT/EXPORT large-scale percussion piece for global objects, 2008
 Journeys of a Cattleherd, 1997

Vocal
 Simple Songs for Modern Life, 6 songs for female a capella vocal trio, 2009
 The Lonely Giant, mini opera for baritone and bass clarinet, 2009

Film
  White Rooms, soundscape production, composition and design for collaboration with filmmakers Giada Dobrzenska and Laura Jennings, [Commissioned by The Sonic Arts Network], premiered at The Institute of Contemporary Art, London 1998
 Pig Alley, soundtrack to US silent film, for bass clarinet, trumpet, percussion and cello, 2008
 OK Computer, music for India's first science fiction comedy TV series, 2021

Electronic Works
 Strange Blooms (suite), 2013
 Café Perdu, 1999
 Punch Me! Bite Me!, 1998
 Zhiva, 1998

Opera
Elizabetta, Opera in two acts, 2019

References

21st-century classical composers
British people of Russian descent
Living people
1975 births
Male classical composers
21st-century male musicians